Robert S. "Bob" Rosenschein is an American-Israeli internet entrepreneur. He was founder, Chairman and CEO of Answers.com, formerly GuruNet, until May 2011, when it was bought by Summit Partner's AFCV Holdings for $127 million. His latest startup was Curiyo.

Early life and career
Rosenschein was born in Harrisburg, Pennsylvania to Jewish parents Martin Rosenschein  and Yolanda Bleier. He graduated with a BSc in Computer Science from the Massachusetts Institute of Technology in 1976. In his early career Rosenschein worked for Data General, American Management Systems, the World Bank, and Ashton-Tate. He moved to Israel in 1983, where he worked as a software consultant.

In 1988 Rosenschein and his brother, Prof. Jeffrey Rosenschein, founded Kivun, later Accent Software. Its initial product was Dagesh, the first Hebrew/English word processor for Windows. From 1991 to 1992, the company consulted to Microsoft, helping design and develop Hebrew and Arabic versions of Windows 3.1. The company went on to develop multi-lingual software tools under the Accent brand. For the Hebrew Windows and Dagesh projects, Rosenschein was awarded the Prime Minister of Israel's Award for Software Achievement in 1997.

In 1999, Rosenschein founded GuruNet with Mort Meyerson and Mark Tebbe, which created a 1-click popup Internet-based information utility. The product later became Answers.com, incorporating both editorial reference and user-generated Q&A information. The company was listed on NASDAQ as Answers Corporation from October 13, 2004 until April 14, 2011, when it was purchased and taken private by AFCV Holdings.

In 2009, Rosenschein was named an Ernst & Young Entrepreneur of the Year 2009 Award Finalist in the Metropolitan New York region.

Rosenschein founded and ran Curiyo from 2013-2016.

See also
Answers.com

Footnotes

External links
 Curiyo demonstration and interview, with Robert Scoble
 Forbes Profile
 Oleh's Unassuming Hero of Start Up Nation
 Surviving a heart attack
 
 

Living people
American computer businesspeople
American technology chief executives
American technology company founders
Businesspeople from Pennsylvania
MIT School of Engineering alumni
People from Harrisburg, Pennsylvania
1953 births
American people of Israeli descent